Villa Rufinella, also called Villa Tuscolana, is a villa in Frascati, Italy.

Villa Rufinella is situated highest of the villas on the hill above the town of Frascati. It was built by Alessandro Ruffini, bishop of Melfi, in 1578, but during its history, the proprietors have made changes in different parts of it. In 1773 the villa became property of the pope. Architect Luigi Vanvitelli, commissioned by the Jesuits, gave the building its present appearance.

In 1804 Pope Pius VII sold the Villa to prince Lucien Bonaparte during his self-imposed exile in Rome. Prince Lucien started the first excavations in the area of the villa and in the territory of Tusculum, sending many of the artifacts found to Paris to be sold on the antiques market. In 1817 a group of bandits of the famous band of robber Gasperoni, commanded by Tommaso Transerici, tried to kidnap the Prince Lucien during one of his parties in the gardens. Instead of the Prince, the bandits kidnapped one of his guests, an artist named Charles de Chatillôn, who softened the bandits by painting portraits of them during his captivity. The Prince was so annoyed by the attack that he sold the villa soon thereafter.

In 1820 the villa was passed into the possession of Princess Maria Anna of Savoy. Queen Maria Christina of Naples and Sicily, wife of Charles Felix of Sardinia, inherited the villa bequeathed to the Princess Maria Anna, and lived there for long periods until 1843. In 1834, to commemorate  his stay as a guest in the villa, Italian poet Giuseppe Gioachino Belli wrote a sonnet in Roman dialect called "La Rufinella". After 1848 the Villa became the property of King Vittorio Emanuele II, who sold it to the Lancellotti family.

The villa suffered heavy damage during World War II (1943–1944). Since 1966 the Villa Rufinella has been owned by the Salesians of Don Bosco, a Roman Catholic religious society: they have restored the building and turned it into a conference hotel.

See also
Luigi Vanvitelli

References

External links

Official website

1578 establishments in Italy
Rufinella
Baroque architecture in Lazio
Luigi Vanvitelli buildings